Phallaria was a genus of flowering plants in the family Rubiaceae but is no longer recognized. It has been sunk into synonymy with Psydrax. It was originally described by Heinrich Christian Friedrich Schumacher and Peter Thonning in 1827 to accommodate two West African species, P. horizontalis and P. spinosa.

Former species 
 Phallaria horizontalis Schumach. & Thonn. = Psydrax horizontalis
 Phallaria lucida (Hochst. ex Hiern) Hochst. = Psydrax odorata ssp. odorata
 Phallaria schimperi Hochst.
 Phallaria spinosa Schumach. & Thonn. = Vangueriella spinosa

References

External links 
 World Checklist of Rubiaceae

Historically recognized Rubiaceae genera
Vanguerieae